ISO 31-1 is the part of international standard ISO 31 that defines names and symbols for quantities and units related to space and time. It was superseded in 2006 by ISO 80000-3.

Definitions 

Its definitions include:

Annex A 

Annex A of ISO 31-1 lists units of space and time based on the foot, pound, and second.

Annex B 

Annex B lists some other non-SI units of space and time, namely the gon, light year, astronomical unit, parsec, tropical year, and gal.

References 

Systems of units
00031-1